Stuart Jardine (born 23 August 1933) is a British sailor. He competed at the 1968 Summer Olympics and the 1972 Summer Olympics.

References

External links
 

1933 births
Living people
British male sailors (sport)
Olympic sailors of Great Britain
Sailors at the 1968 Summer Olympics – Star
Sailors at the 1972 Summer Olympics – Star
Sportspeople from Salisbury